Fundão may refer to:

Places

Brazil
 Fundão Municipality, Brazil, a municipality in the State of Espírito Santo

Portugal
 Fundão Municipality, Portugal, a municipality in the district of Castelo Branco

Municipality name disambiguation pages